Yelena Igorevna Soya (November 9, 1981, Moscow, USSR)  is a Russian Synchro-swimmer.

She has Olympic gold medal in team competition in 2000 and won two European Championships (1999, 2000).

She was a member of national team in 1999-2000.

Her father Igor Soya is a coach of a modern pentathlete Dmitri Svatkovskiy.
On 1 January 2010, She is working with the Russian Palarympic Committee.

External links
 Yelena Soya's profile 

Russian synchronized swimmers
Olympic synchronized swimmers of Russia
Synchronized swimmers at the 2000 Summer Olympics
Olympic gold medalists for Russia
1981 births
Living people
Swimmers from Moscow
Olympic medalists in synchronized swimming
Medalists at the 2000 Summer Olympics